Bellum Catilinae (War of Catiline), also called  (Conspiracy of Catiline), is the first history published by the Roman historian Sallust. The second historical monograph in Latin literature, it chronicles the attempted overthrow of the government by the aristocrat Catiline in 63 BC in what has been usually called the Catilinarian conspiracy.

The narrative of the monograph was seized upon as illustrating the moral and social decadence of the ruling Roman classes, particularly the Roman Senate. Sallust continually critiques Roman corruption throughout his narration.

Summary
The history begins with a brief preface on the nature of man, history, and a brief autobiography of Sallust himself. Afterwards, Sallust launches into a character description of Catiline, who is portrayed as at once heroic and immoral, and then a description of Catiline's intention to gain kingship at any cost. However, Sallust tells his readership that Catiline's political ambitions were thwarted several times in his youth, and perhaps alludes to the First Catilinarian conspiracy, and he finally resorts to rebellion, during which attempts to recruit a number of bankrupt nobles and politically dissatisfied plebeians. The Senate eventually discovers the conspiracy, and attempts to put it down militarily. In the one and only battle of the rebellion, Catiline is killed by the Roman army, bringing the rebellion to an end.

Publication
Bellum Catilinae was probably written during the last half of the 1st century BC. After writing it, Sallust went on to author , a historical account of the Jugurthine War.

Legacy
G. W. S. Barrow has shown that one passage in the Declaration of Arbroath was carefully written using different parts of Bellum Catilinae as the direct source:

Translations 
The following are some translations of Bellum Catilinae, sorted reverse chronologically.

  Update to Rolfe's earlier Loeb; major changes made to Latin text and translations.

References 
 Citations

 Sources

External links
 

1st-century BC history books
1st-century BC Latin books
Catiline
Monographs
Roman historiography